François Zourabichvili (Georgian: ფრანსუა ზურაბიშვილი; 28 August 1965 – 19 April 2006) was a French philosopher who specialized in the works of Gilles Deleuze and Baruch Spinoza.

Biography
François Zourabichvili was the son of composer Nicolas Zourabichvili, nephew of historian Hélène Carrère d'Encausse, and cousin of author Emmanuel Carrère. He became agrégé in 1989 and earned his PhD in Philosophy in 1999. He taught at a lycee already from 1988 to 2001, was docent at Paul Valéry University, Montpellier III, and a director at the Collège international de philosophie from 1998 to 2004. He committed suicide in 2006 and is buried in the Russian Church of the Holy Trinity in Paris (XVIe arrondissement).

A year after Zourabichvili's death, the Collège international de philosophie and the École normale supérieure organized a colloquium upon Les physiques de la pensée selon François Zourabichvili ("The physics of thinking according to François Zourabichvili") led by Bruno Clément and Frédéric Worms. The event took place with the participation of Pierre Macherey, Pierre-François Moreau, Pierre Zaoui, Paola Marrati, Paul R. Patton, Paolo Godani and Marie-France Badie.

Work
François Zourabichvili worked primarily on the concepts of "event" and "littéralité", inspired by the philosophy of Deleuze.
In addition, he wrote about aesthetics, a discipline in which he centered his interest for the purpose of finding relations between art and game. He published some articles about the films of Boris Barnet and Dziga Vertov.

Partial bibliography
La philosophie de Deleuze. Quadrige (P.U.F.): Manuel. with Paola Marrati, Anne Sauvagnargues. Editor P.U.F.
La littéralité et autres essais sur l'art. Lignes d'art. Con Anne Sauvagnargues. Editor P.U.F.
Leibniz et la barbarie. Editor Champ Vallon, 2005
Spinoza. Une physique de la pensée, Paris, P.U.F., 2002
Le conservatisme paradoxal de Spinoza. Enfance et royauté, Paris, P.U.F.
Le vocabulaire de Deleuze, Paris, Ellipses, « Vocabulaire de... », 2003
La philosophie de l'événement. París: PUF, 1994

References

1965 births
2006 deaths
Continental philosophers
Philosophers of art
Scholars of modern philosophy
Scholars of contemporary philosophy
French male essayists
20th-century French essayists
20th-century French male writers
20th-century French philosophers
Spinoza scholars
French people of Georgian descent
2006 suicides
Suicides in France
Zourabichvili family